Collingwood Collegiate Institute (known as CCI) is a public secondary school (grades 9–12) located in Collingwood, Ontario, Canada. It currently has an enrollment of about 1399 students and employs over 80 teachers and staff. The principal is Curt Davidson. The school is administered by the Simcoe County District School Board (SCDSB).

The school offers a wide range of courses and activities such as English arts, math, physical education & technology. CCI also has a fair selection of sport teams such as football, rugby & hockey. Students that attend CCI come from Collingwood, Wasaga Beach, Blue Mountain and Clearview Township (Nottawa, Duntroon, Singhampton).

The superintendent of the school is Greg Jacobs. (Area F schools- Essa, Clearview, Wasaga Beach & Collingwood).

Feeder schools
Admiral Collingwood ES
Cameron Street PS
Connaught PS
Mountain View PS
Nottawa ES
Worsley ES
Birchview Dunes ES

References

High schools in Simcoe County